Decision Day is the fifteenth studio album by the German thrash metal band Sodom, released on 26 August 2016. This is Sodom's final album with guitarist Bernd "Bernemann" Kost and drummer Markus "Makka" Freiwald, who both parted ways with the band in January 2018, and it would be the last time the band had recorded together as a three-piece, a distinction Sodom had held since its inception. The artwork of Decision Day was designed by Joe Petagno. "Sacred Warpath", a track released two years earlier on the EP with the same title, was also re-recorded for this album.

Track listing

Personnel

Credits
 Tom Angelripper – vocals and bass guitar
 Bernd "Bernemann" Kost – lead and rhythm guitar
 Markus "Makka" Freiwald – drums

Production
 Cornelius Rambadt – production
 Joe Petagno – album cover

Charts

References

2016 albums
Sodom (band) albums
SPV/Steamhammer albums